Haptoclinus apectolophus, the Uncombed blenny, is a species of labrisomid blenny known only from Arrowsmith Bank off of the Yucatan Peninsula.

References

apectolophus
Fish described in 1974